The 2005 AFC Champions League was the 24th edition of the top-level Asian club football tournament and the 3rd edition under the current AFC Champions League title. The championship was retained by the Saudi Arabian club Al-Ittihad with a 5–3 aggregate victory over Al Ain from the United Arab Emirates. Following a 1–1 draw at the Tahnoun bin Mohammed Stadium in Al Ain in the first leg, Al-Ittihad recorded a 4–2 victory at the Prince Abdullah Al Faisal Stadium in Jeddah to lift the trophy for the second consecutive season. They also qualified for the 2005 FIFA Club World Cup.

Format
Group Stage
A total of 28 clubs were divided into 7 groups of four, based on region i.e. East Asian and Southeast Asian clubs were drawn in groups E to G, while the rest were grouped in groups A to D.  Each club played double round-robin (home and away) against fellow three group members, a total of 6 matches each.  Clubs received 3pts for a win, 1pt for a tie, 0pts for a loss.  The clubs were ranked according to points and tie breakers were in the following order:
 Points earned between the clubs in question
 Goal Differential between the clubs in question
 Goals For between the clubs in question
 Points earned within the group
 Goal Differential within the group
 Goals For within the group

The seven group winners along with the defending champion advanced to the quarter-finals.

Knockout Round
All 8 clubs were randomly matched; however, the only restriction was that the clubs from the same country could not face each other in the quarter-finals.  The games were conducted in 2 legs, home and away, and the aggregate score decided the match winner.  If the aggregate score couldn't produce a winner, "away goals rule" was used.  If still tied, clubs played extra time, where "away goals rule" still applied.  If still tied, the game went to penalties.

Group stage

Group A

Group B

Group C

Group D

Group E

Group F

Group G

Knock-out stage

Bracket

Quarter-finals

First leg

Second leg

Shenzhen Jianlibao won 4–3 on aggregate.

4–4 on aggregate, Al Ain won on away goals.

Busan IPark won 5–1 on aggregate.

Al-Ittihad won 8–3 on aggregate.

Semi-finals

First leg

Second leg

Al Ain won 6–0 on aggregate.

Al-Ittihad won 7–0 on aggregate.

Final

First leg

Second leg

Al-Ittihad won 5–3 on aggregate.

See also
2005 FIFA Club World Championship

References

External links
AFC Champions League 2005 Official Page (English)
AFC Champions League 2005 at RSSSF.com

1
2005